Bing Boy was an Australian chain of urban Asian street food restaurants, founded in Adelaide in 2011. The chain specialises in jianbing (also called Chinese crepes).

The first Bing Boy store was opened in Southern Cross Arcade at Rundle Mall, Adelaide, in June 2011. Founder Ming Ma modeled Bing Boy on the concept of fresh, fast delivery of jianbing that he says is common in China. At Bing Boy stores, bings made of traditional thin wheat omelette with various fillings, are made in full view of patrons.

The first Melbourne Bing Boy opened in November 2012.

References

Fast-food chains of Australia
Chinese restaurants outside China
Restaurants established in 2011
2011 establishments in Australia
Companies based in Adelaide